Niranjan M. Khilnani (27 November 1922 - 14 December 2012) was a historian, scholar, professional writer and commentator on Indian and International Affairs.

Early life 
Khilnani was born at Sukkur, Sindh to Manohardas Kauromal Khilnani and Smt Amrit Devi (Ambi d/o Kundan das Keswani). He was the grandson of Rai Bahadur Dewan Kauromal Chandanmal Khilnani of Bhiriya in Sindh. His brother Ashok Khilnani lives in Los Angeles, California married to Renu Khilnani with sons Madhu- Mark Khilnani, Keerti - Keith Khilnani. He was the youngest to secure a PhD from Bombay University at age 25 in 1947. He did his post doctoral research  at Yale University.

Personal life 
He married Chitra (Shanta d/o Hassanand Tolani) who stayed in New Delhi. His elder son is  Ravi Khilnani who married Sunita with children Rishav and Kanika. His younger son  is Vijay Khilnani who married Poonam Khilnani. They bore a daughter, Divya Khilnani.

Career 
After partition he became the youngest lecturer at Hindu College, Delhi University. In 1951 he joined  the Ministry of External Affairs where he rose to the level of Director, Historical Division.

He served with the Ministry of External Affairs from 1951 to 1980. He was the External Affairs Ministry’s expert on Latin America, Sikkim, Bhutan and Nepal.

In 1968, he visited Peru, Chile and Ecuador on a Human Rights Fellowship of the United Nations. In 1972 he represented India at the Second United Nations Geographical Conference in London. Khilnani was associated with CHOGM Conference and the 7th Non-aligned Summit in 1983 in New Delhi. After his retirement from the Ministry of External Affairs, Khilnani  served on the Sarkaria Commission for  Center - State  relations.

In 1990 Khilnani visited Moscow as a visiting Professor

He wrote extensively for the national and international press.

Recognition 
 In 1952 Khilnani  was awarded a Fulbright fellowship.
 While at Yale he won a prize for writing the best term-paper on the New Deal Policies of Franklin Delano Roosevelt.
 Khilnani attended the coronation ceremony of Her Majesty Queen Elizabeth II in 1953.

Publications and Books
Khilnani published several books. His Panorama of Indian Diplomacy, Realities of Indian Foreign Policy, Road to Independence (1857 to 1947), Four Diamonds of Anand Bhavan, Indira Gandhi-the Iron Lady of Indian Politics, won acclaim.
 The Punjab under the Lawrences
 British power in the Punjab, 1839-1858
 Glimpses of Hindu America : Story of India’s Relations with Latin America
 Four diamonds of Anand Bhavan: Motilal Nehru, Jawaharlal Nehru, Indira  Gandhi and Rajiv Gandhi a perceptive analysis of Indian political  experience from 1929 to 1987
 Emergence of New Russia: Panoramic Survey of Russian History 
 Panorama of modern Indus Valley
 New dimensions of Indian foreign policy : Prime minister Narasimha Rao’s Era X-rayed (hardcover)
 Socio-political dimensions of modern India
 The denuclearization of South Asia
 India’s political and economic policies towards her neighbours
 India 1990 : 1991 to 2001 AD
 Panorama of Indian diplomacy: From Mauryan epoch to post-Nehru era
 Iron Lady of Indian Politics: Indira Gandhi in the Balanced Perspective 
 India's Road to Independence 1857 to 1947 (Panorama of India's Struggle for Freedom)
 Realities of Indian foreign policy

References 

1922 births
2012 deaths
Pakistani writers
Pakistani expatriates in the United States